Tras may refer to:
 Tras (state constituency), in Malaysia
 tras, a Spanish preposition
 Tras Honan (born 1930), Irish politician
 Xavier Tras, a fictional name used in cricket scoring

See also 
 Tras Street, a street in Singapore
 
 Trass